Friis is a name of Danish origin, meaning Frisian person. It may refer to any of the following people:

 Astrid Friis (1893–1966), Danish historian
 Christen Friis (1581-1639), Danish politician
 Eigil Friis-Christensen, Danish geophysicist
 Harald T. Friis (1893-1976), American radio engineer. There are two equations in communications theory named after him:
 Friis formulas for noise
 Friis transmission equation
 Henrik Friis Robberstad (1901-1978), Norwegian politician
 Jacob Friis (1883-1956), member of the Executive Committee of the Communist International
 Jakob Johan Sigfrid Friis (1883-1956), Norwegian politician
 Jakob Friis-Hansen (born 1967), a former Danish footballer 
 Janus Friis (born 1976), Danish entrepreneur
 Johan Friis (1494-1570), Danish statesman
 Jørgen Friis, Danish bishop 
 Kristian Friis Petersen (1867-1932), Norwegian Minister of Social Affairs
 Lotte Friis (1988), Danish swimmer
 Michael Pedersen Friis (1857-1944), Prime Minister of Denmark
 Nicolai Friis (1815-1888), Norwegian politician
 Peder Claussøn Friis (1545-1614), Norwegian author
 Søren Friis (born 1976), Danish professional football midfielder
 Torsten Friis (1882-1967), Swedish Air Force lieutenant general

Danish-language surnames
Surnames of Frisian origin

et:Friis
sv:Friis från Ribe